Polyptychoides digitatus is a moth of the family Sphingidae. It is known from heavy forest up to 8,000 feet from Liberia and Angola to Uganda and western Kenya.

The length of the forewings is 39–41 mm for males. Females are larger and have broader wings.

References

Polyptychoides
Moths described in 1891
Moths of Africa